The Knocks 1992–2000 is a greatest hits compilation by American rapper Jay Tee. It was released February 13, 2001 on Jay Tee's own label, 40 Ounce Records. The songs are culled from the N2Deep and Latino Velvet music catalogs. Two of the songs, "California Hot Tubs" and "What You Do", were newly remixed for this compilation. The album features guest performances by E-40, Mac Dre, Baby Beesh, B-Legit, Levitti, Taydatay, Don Cisco and Frost. It features production by Johnny Z, Ken Franklin, Lev Berlak, Philly Blunt and Jay Tee.

Track listing

External links
 [ The Knocks 1992–2000] at Allmusic
 The Knocks 1992–2000 at Discogs
 The Knocks 1992–2000 at Tower Records

Jay Tee albums
2001 greatest hits albums
Self-released albums
West Coast hip hop compilation albums
Gangsta rap compilation albums